Sir Max Leonard Waechter (3 October 1837 – 3 October 1924) was a businessman, art collector, philanthropist and advocate of a federal Europe.

Career
Waechter was born in Stettin, then in Germany and now Szczecin in Poland. His father was Julius Leonard Waechter, a Lutheran pastor. He went to England in 1859 and was naturalised as a British citizen in 1865.

Waechter became a partner in Bessler, Waechter, and Co., a merchant firm. He advocated improved relations between Britain and Germany and in 1913 founded the European Federation League.

Waechter lived in Terrace House on Richmond Hill. He held the post of High Sheriff of Surrey in 1902.

Waechter was made a Knight Bachelor in the 1902 Birthday Honours and knighted by King Edward VII at Buckingham Palace on 18 December 1902.

Family
Waechter married twice. His first wife, whom he married at St John the Divine, Richmond in 1873, was Harriett Shallcross, whose father, the Liberal MP Thomas Cave, owned Queensberry House. His second wife was Armatrude Hobart. His only son, Harry Waechter, also a businessman and philanthropist, was created a baronet in 1911.

Death and legacy
Waechter contributed, anonymously, to a fund established to erect a memorial in Richmond to Princess Mary, Duchess of Teck; a memorial fountain was erected outside the Richmond Gate to Richmond Park.
Waechter owned Glover's Island which he donated to the Borough of Richmond in 1900. He helped preserve the  view from Richmond across the river by preventing destructive development.

Waechter died in 1924 and is buried in Richmond Cemetery.

Publications
 Waechter, Max: European Federation: A Lecture Delivered at the London Institution on the 25th February 1909, Jordan & Sons, Limited, 1909, 15pp.
 Waechter, Max: The United States of Europe: How to Make War Impossible, Twentieth Century Press, 1922, 11pp.
 Waechter, Max: How to Abolish War: The United States of Europe, 1924, 12pp.
 Waechter, Max: The Principal Lesson of the Balkan Wars OCLC 82740175

See also
Richmond, Petersham and Ham Open Spaces Act 1902

References

Further reading
 Entry in Who Was Who
 Obituary in The Times, 4 October 1924, p. 11

 Le Dréau, Christophe. "Un européisme britannique conquérant: les tentatives d’implantation de la New Commonwealth Society et de Federal Union sur le continent (1938–1940)", Cahiers de l'Irice, n°1, 2008.
 Tiedau, Ulrich. "Max Waechter, Anglo-German rapprochement, and the European Unity League, 1906–1924" in D'Auria Matthew; Vermeiren, Jan (eds.) Visions and Ideas of Europe during the First World War, Routledge, 2019. 

1837 births
1924 deaths
19th-century British philanthropists
20th-century British philanthropists
British art collectors
Burials at Richmond Cemetery
Businesspeople from Szczecin
English philanthropists
European integration pioneers
German emigrants to the United Kingdom
Knights Bachelor
Naturalised citizens of the United Kingdom
People from Richmond, London
People from the Province of Pomerania